River 94.9 (callsign: 4MIX) is a commercial radio station that broadcasts to South-East Queensland. The station opened in February 1990, and was formerly known as Star 106.9, which used to operate on the frequency now occupied by Nova 106.9. The station was previously owned by Rural Press & Bundaberg Broadcasters, forming part of the Star Broadcasting Network, followed by Grant Broadcasters.

History

As QFM
From its launch until 1997, QFM broadcast contemporary hit music format.

As Star 106.9
In 1997, QFM rebranded as Star 106.9, dropping a CHR format for a classic hits format.

Prior to the switch to 94.9, Star's callsign was changed from 4QFM to 4MIX, supposedly to block Australian Radio Network station 97.3fm from using the Mix positioner used by its sister stations.

As River 94.9
In 2001, Star FM upgraded their transmitter and moved to 94.9 MHz in order to better broadcast into Brisbane, avoiding interference of two other very strong signals - ABC Classic FM on 106.1 and triple j on 107.7. The move to 94.9 eliminated that problem, and, on the flipside, means the station has equal to better reach than the Brisbane radio stations towards the west and Toowoomba, with a large volume of advertisements for companies and stores in those regions. As part of the change, the station took on an adult variety format.'Wild Nights', a dance music format licensed from Central Station Records based on community radio station Wild FM was added to the late night programming from the end of January 2001.

Despite broadcasting into part of the Brisbane area, the station is not officially counted in Brisbane ratings surveys, however 2017 saw the first ever Ipswich radio survey where River 94.9 dominated (26.4%) 

In 2008, River 94.9 was the official broadcaster for South-East Queensland, of the Macquarie Radio Network's Olympic Radio Coverage. It was sold in May of that year to Grant Broadcasters by owners Fairfax Media, due to diversity rules controlled by Australian Communications and Media Authority, which prevents more than 2 licences overlapping into a market owned by the same group.

In November 2021, River 94.9, along with other stations owned by Grant Broadcasters, were acquired by the Australian Radio Network. This deal will allow Grant's stations, including River 94.9, to access ARN's iHeartRadio platform in regional areas. The deal was finalized on January 4, 2022. To comply with Australian Communications & Media Authority regulations that limit the number of radio stations an owner can have in one city, ARN is forced to sell 4KQ at some point in time.

River 94.9 simulcasts Nine News Queensland at 6:00 pm every weekday.

Current programming:

5am-9am: Marnie & Campo for Brekky  
9am-12pm: Mornings with Woody (including 94 minutes non-stop 9am-10:34am) 
12pm-3pm: Afternoons with Hinksy (including “ The Flashback Lunch” (80's and 90's) at 12pm)  
3pm-6pm: The Home Run with Ilija (including the 3pm Shutup, The 4 at 4, and Music Masters)  
6pm-7pm: Nine News Simulcast with Andrew Lofthouse & Melissa Downes (Sun-Fri) 
7pm-9pm: 20/20 Retro Countdown with Aaron Stevens

River 94.9 also does “Flashback Friday” going back to the 70s, 80s and 90s every Friday between 9am and 6pm. Also, every weekend they do a different Weekend Music Feature, with a feature all weekend (e.g. 80's weekend, or an “ Unflogged Weekend”)

References

External links
 River 94.9 River 94.9's official site

Radio stations in Queensland
Radio stations established in 1990
Adult contemporary radio stations in Australia
Australian Radio Network